Kempinski Residences, Jakarta is a residential skyscraper at Jalan M.H. Thamrin, Central Jakarta, Indonesia. The tower has 57 level above the floor and 215 meters tall. The building is a residential facility, managed by Kempinski. The building is connected to Grand Indonesia Shopping Town and Hotel Indonesia.

See also

Skyscraper design and construction
List of tallest buildings in Indonesia
List of tallest buildings in Jakarta

References

Buildings and structures in Jakarta
Skyscrapers in Indonesia
Post-independence architecture of Indonesia
Residential skyscrapers in Indonesia